Anthony Ninos (February 7, 1919 – April 26, 2014) was an American businessman and politician.

Biography 
Ninos was born in Lockport, New York. He received his bachelor's degree in ceramic engineering from Alfred University. He served in the United States Army during World War II.

In 1949, Nino moved to Cocoa, Florida, where he owned and operated the Brevard Hotel. Ninos served on the Cocoa City Council and then served as mayor, from 1959 until 1963. He then served in the Florida House of Representatives in 1967 as a Democrat. He died in Cocoa, Florida.

References

1919 births
2014 deaths
Mayors of places in Florida
Democratic Party members of the Florida House of Representatives
Businesspeople from Florida
Florida city council members
Alfred University alumni
People from Cocoa, Florida
Politicians from Lockport, New York
20th-century American businesspeople